Roland Mitchell (born March 15, 1964)  is a former cornerback who played eight seasons in the National Football League (NFL).

1964 births
Living people
American football cornerbacks
Texas Tech Red Raiders football players
Buffalo Bills players
Phoenix Cardinals players
Atlanta Falcons players
Green Bay Packers players
People from Columbus, Texas